Nathália Suellen (born 20 February 1989) is a surrealist digital artist and commercial illustrator from Rio de Janeiro, Brazil.

Overview
Entirely self-taught, Suellen's signature style incorporates female in surroundings of a twisted and disturbing world characterized by the use of symbolism, retro-futurism and dystopia, born from a high-detailed mixture of photography, 3D and digital painting.

The themes of her work include self-discovery, sorrow, dreams/nightmares, fear of unknown, mortality, femininity and the juxtaposition of the pop surrealism and dark art imagery.

Her main characters are often captured in scenes where something sad is about to happen, as if they were trapped in a bad dream.

"Cinematic Styled Artist", as labeled by the BritishAdvanced Photoshop magazine in 2012, Suellen developed her unique style and technique by creating photo collage that result from a combination of commercial lighting and digital painting, tending to have a cinematic finish with each new work.

Nathália started her own business in 2008, specializing in dark art, cover design and photo manipulation.

Despite her personal illustrations, Nathália is mostly known by her commercial works and a notable clientele list which consists of musicians, photographers, best-selling writers as well as major companies including Random House, Penguin Group, HarperCollins, Simon & Schuster, McCann Erickson, Scholastic and Harry N. Abrams Books.

Selected press 
 Imagine Fx magazine,(Future Publishing) "Cover Stars":"If you wanna be my cover", 2012, issue 91, p17
 Imagine Fx magazine, issue 97 July, 2013.
 Idea photos magazine, May/June 2009, China
 IEVA 2013, Lithuania
 Photoshop Creative Brasil, Issue 17, 48
 Sketchoholic Book Art (Mad Artist Publishing): Vanity, 2012
 Julia Kuzmenko: Digital Photo Retouching: Beauty, Fashion & Portrait Photography Book Mad Artist Publishing
 Folha de S. Paulo, 2011
 Redivider 9.2, Art and Literature, 2012
 Dark Beauty Magazine Feature, Emptiness of Winter Solstice, 2011
 Faerie Magazine Cover, "Tales of the Silk Road" Issue 23, 2012

Selected works 
 Dark Moor  – "Ars Musica", 2013
 Almah, "Unfold" 2013 
 Noturna (band)  – "A Dream Within a Dream", 2011
 The Grisha Trilogy: "The Gathering Dark"  ["Shadow and Bone" (USA)], Leigh Bardugo – The New York Times bestselling author, (Orion Publishing Group) – 
 Raven Quinn (American musician) – Art to "Not in Vain" Album – 2012
 "Last Kiss Goodnight", Gena Showalter – The New York Times and USA Today bestselling author,(Simon & Schuster) – 
 "Black and Blue", Gena Showalter – The New York Times and USA Today bestselling author,(Simon & Schuster) – 
 "Kill My Only Enemy", Disdained (band), Album Art – (Rambo/Sony Music)
 "Iraena's Ashes", Alpine Fault (band), 2012 – Album Art – (Rare Breed Records)
 "Splintered" and "Unhinged" by A.G Howard. (Abrams Books Publishing) – 
 "On the other side" series by Denise Grover Swank
 "Here"(2011) and "There"(2012) –  / 
 "The Splendor Falls", Rosemary Clement-Moore (Random House) 2009 – 
 "Dark Descendant", Jenna Black – (Simon & Schuster) – 
"Above", Leah Bobet, (Scholastic Publishing), 2012 – 
 The Cursed Ones, Nancy Holder, 2010 (Simon & Schuster) – 
 The Replacement, Brenna Yovanoff, 2011 (Simon & Schuster) – 
 A Brush of Darkness, Allison Pang, (Simon & Schuster), 2011 – 
 Coveted series: Compelled and Bitter Disenchantment, Shawntelle Madison –

References

External links 
 
 Nathalia Suellen on deviantART
 Nathalia Suellen Official Facebook

Living people
1989 births
21st-century Brazilian women artists
21st-century Brazilian artists
Brazilian contemporary artists
Brazilian illustrators
Brazilian women illustrators
Brazilian surrealist artists
Fantasy artists
Digital artists
Women digital artists
People from Rio de Janeiro (city)